Victoria Borisova-Ollas (born 21 December 1969, Vladivostok) is a Russian-Swedish composer who first received international recognition for her symphonic poem Wings of the Wind which won second prize in the 1998 Masterprize International Composition Competition in the UK.

She has composed two symphonies, Symphony No. 1 "The Triumph of Heaven" and Symphony No. 2 "Labyrinths of Time".

Her opera The Ground Beneath Her Feet, with a libretto written by Edward Kemp, is an adaptation of the novel of that name by Salman Rushdie. The premiere at Bridgewater Hall during the 2007 Manchester International Festival was narrated by Alan Rickman, conducted by Mark Elder, and featured a film component by Mike Figgis.

Since 2008 she has been a member of the Royal Swedish Academy of Music.

Prizes and awards
 1997 - Royal Swedish Academy of Music scholarship to study at the Royal College of Music in London
 1998 - Second place in the Masterprize International Composing Competition for Wings of the Wind
 2000 - The Society of Swedish Composers scholarship
 2005 - The Christ Johnson Prize (Christ Johnson-prisen) minor award for Symphony No. 1 The Triumph of Heaven
 2006 - TCO Culture Award (awarded jointly)
 2008 - Member of the Royal Swedish Academy of Music Award
 2008 - Music Publishers Award (Musikförläggarna) for The Ground Beneath Her Feet
 2009 - The Rosenberg Prize (Hilding Constantin Rosenberg prize)
 2010 - Music Publishers Award (Musikförläggarna) for Golden Dances of the Pharaohs
 2011 - Christ Johnson Award (Christ Johnson-prisen) Grand Prize of the Golden Dances of the Pharaohs
 2016 - The Stockholm Music Association (Musikföreningen i Stockholm) Choir-composer Scholarship
 2017 - Expressen's Spelmannen Award for 2016
 STIM's Scholarship - 1998, 2000, 2001, 2003

Selected works

Orchestral 
 Image – Reflection (1994) for 2 violins and orchestra
 A Shadow of the Night (1995) for orchestra
 Octagon (1996) for piano and orchestra
 Schreitende Alléen (1997) for orchestra
 Wings of the Wind (1997) for orchestra
 Symphony No.1 The Triumph of Heaven (2003) for orchestra
 Colours of Autumn (2002) for orchestra
 The Kingdom of Silence (2003) for orchestra
 Before the Mountains Were Born (2005) for woodwind and orchestra
 Open Ground (2006) for orchestra
 Angelus (2008) for orchestra
 Golden Dances of the Pharaohs (2010) for clarinet and orchestra
 Träumerei (2010), transcription for symphony orchestra of a piano piece by Robert Schumann
 Wunderbare Leiden (2010) fantasy on themes by Robert and Clara Schumann for two pianos and symphony orchestra

Large ensemble 
 Keter (2003) for 12 saxophones
 Creation of the Hymn (2013) for string orchestra

Chamber and small ensemble 
 Rainbow Hunt (1995) for flute, saxophone, guitar, percussion and tape
 Creation of the Hymn (1996) for string quartet
 Behind the Shadows (1998) for viola, cello, contrabass and percussion
 ...im Klosterhofe (1998) for cello, piano and tape
 ...ein schöner Winterabend in Sachsen (1999) for violin and piano
 Roosters in Love (1999) for saxophone quartet
 Ce n'est pas le geste qui dure... (2002) for flute, guitar, viola and cello
 In a World Unspoken (2005) for saxophone quartet and organ
 Seven Singing Butterflies (2005) for clarinet and string quartet

Choral 
  Psalm 42: Wie der Hirsch schreit (2008) for orchestra, two soloists, mixed choir and organ
 Vinden som ingenting minns (2015) for choir and orchestra

Opera and stage 
 The Ground Beneath Her Feet (2007) stage performance for orchestra, singers and narrators (Libretto: Edward Kemp after a novel of the same name by Salman Rushdie)
 Hamlet drama (2008) for trombone and orchestra (Libretto: William Shakespeare)
 Dracula (2017) opera

Keyboard works 
 Hymn i sten (1996) for piano
 Adoration of the Magi in the Snow (2000) a polyphonic fantasy for organ
 Silent Island (2000) for piano
 A Midnight Bell (2002) for piano
 Secret Beauty of Waters (2004) for piano
 Serenade for Twins (2004) for piano
 Djurgården Tales (2009–11) for two pianos

References

External links
 

1969 births
20th-century classical composers
20th-century Russian musicians
20th-century Russian women musicians
20th-century Swedish musicians
20th-century women composers
21st-century classical composers
21st-century Swedish musicians
21st-century women composers
Alumni of the Royal College of Music
Women opera composers
Living people
Musicians from Vladivostok
Russian women classical composers
Russian opera composers
Swedish classical composers
Swedish women classical composers
Swedish opera composers
20th-century Swedish women musicians